John Robert Thompson III (born March 11, 1966) is the assistant coach for the United States men's national basketball team since 2017.  He previously served as the head coach of the men's basketball team at Georgetown University. He grew up in Washington, D.C. and was named first team All-Metro by The Washington Post while playing for Gonzaga College High School in 1984. Thompson was hired on April 20, 2004, to replace Craig Esherick and was fired at the end of the 2017 season. Prior to being hired at Georgetown, Thompson was the head coach for four years at his alma mater, Princeton University. Thompson is the son of John Thompson Jr, Georgetown's head coach from 1972 to 1999, and is a 1988 graduate of Princeton University.

Coaching career

Princeton

Thompson was hired by Princeton in 2000 as a replacement for Bill Carmody, who had departed for Northwestern after having led them to the NCAA Tournament and the National Invitation Tournament twice each. Thompson guided the Tigers to a record of 16–11 (11–3 conference record), which was good enough to win the Ivy League for the first time since 1998. The following year, the Tigers went 16–12 (11–4) to finish in a three-way tie for the Ivy League title, which resulted in them having to play in a tiebreaker tournament, which they lost to Yale. The following year, they went 16–11 (10–4) and finished 3rd in the conference. In his final season in 2003, he led them to twenty wins while losing only one conference game to win the Ivy League for the third time in Thompson's four years at the program and the sixth overall time in the last eight years.

Georgetown
Thompson was hired by Georgetown in 2004 to replace Craig Esherick. Esherick (as had been the case with his predecessor John Thompson) had utilized an offense built on quick and physical play; however, Georgetown had not made the NCAA Tournament in six of the last seven years. Thompson III immediately introduced the Princeton offense at Georgetown, a style of play that he learned from coach Pete Carril at Princeton as a player and assistant coach; the offense is cited as more deliberate in nature with establishing scoring opportunities through ball movement alongside passes and backdoor cuts. The 2004-05 team started out fair, with Thompson's first win over a ranked team coming against Pittsburgh on January 5. However, the Hoyas finished 16-11 after losing five straight games to end the regular season, which meant they finished 7th in the Big East Conference. They fell to Connecticut in the Quarterfinals of the Big East tournament, but the Hoyas were invited to the NIT that year; the Hoyas went to the Quarterfinal before losing to South Carolina.

In 2005, the team won 23 games while finish tied for fourth in the Big East, and they would receive a bid to the NCAA Tournament, the first for the team since 2001. Thompson's first notable win with the team took place on January 21, 2006, when unranked Georgetown upset No. 1 Duke. This was Georgetown's first win over a No. 1 ranked team in 21 years. The Hoyas received a seventh seed in the South Region. They beat Northern Iowa and Ohio State to reach the Sweet Sixteen against Florida, where they lost 57-53 to the eventual national champions.

The 2006 team, led by players such as Roy Hibbert, reached their potential. The Hoyas would go on a tremendous run that year, as they won twelve of their last thirteen games en route to a Big East championship. They won their first regular season title since 1997 before rolling to victory in the Big East tournament for their first tournament title since 1989. The Hoyas were seeded as a two-seed in the East Region, their highest seeding since 1996. They would beat Belmont, Boston College, and Vanderbilt to reach the Elite Eight. Facing the top seed in North Carolina, the Hoyas trailed by as much as eleven points with twelve minutes remaining before rallying to win 96-84 and reach the Final Four for the first time since 1985. They faced Ohio State in the Final Four; the game was tied with nine minutes remaining, but the Buckeyes went on a 23-16 run to beat Georgetown 67-60. 

While the 2006-07 season was a banner year for the Hoyas, it also would prove to be the high point of Thompson's tenure at Georgetown. It would be the last time that the Hoyas would survive the tournament's opening weekend under Thompson; indeed, Thompson would only win two more tournament games.

The 2015-16 season was a disappointment for all sides involved. They notched one ranked victory in nonconference play and were 7-5, and expectations were fair for a contending team. Big East play would prove to be a disaster, as the Hoyas went 8-13, which included losing seven of the last eight games in the regular season. It was the first time in his tenure that the Hoyas were not invited to either the NCAA Tournament or the NIT. After the season, Thompson (dubbed one of the "most polarizing figures in college sports" by the campus newspaper) called the season the most challenging of his career. The 2016-17 season proved to be the last for Thompson as coach. A 9-4 non-conference record ended up being a mirage for a miserable season of Big East play, where they went 5-13. They managed to beat three ranked teams (including eleventh-ranked Butler in January), but the Hoyas lost seven of their last eight games to finish below .500 for the second straight year, which was the first time Georgetown had suffered back-to-back losing seasons since 1972-1973. On March 23, 2017 (fifteen days after the Hoyas lost in the First Round of the Big East tournament), Thompson was fired. Thompson's 13-year tenure as head coach is the second longest in Georgetown history, and his 278 wins are also second all-time in school history–in both cases, only behind his father.

United States Men's National Team
On October 12, 2017, Thompson was named by USA Basketball as the assistant coach of the United States men's national basketball team for all FIBA World Cup qualifiers leading to the 2019 FIBA World Cup.  This was his second time as an assistant coach in the National Programme;  he has previously (2008) served as an assistant for the Under 18 men's team.

Washington Wizards
In July 2019, Thompson joined Monumental Sports & Entertainment, owner of the NBA's Washington Wizards and WNBA's Washington Mystics, to become the lead of their newly formed athlete development and engagement department.

Head coaching record

See also
 List of NCAA Division I Men's Final Four appearances by coach

References

Additional sources
Branch, John (2007). "Hoyas' Past Is Becoming Present",New York Times, March 23.
Davis, Barker (2006). "Hoyas survive big scare", Washington Times, January 25.
Graff, Garrett "Thompson discusses Georgetown's 2008 season", The Washingtonian, December 4, 2007.

Heaps, Bailey and Olivia Scott (2007). "JT III Signs on for Six More Years", The Hoya, September 28.
Powell, Camille (2006). "Hoyas KO the Big", Washington Post, January 22, p. E-1.
Wise, Mike (2006). "Princeton Offense Keeps Hoyas on the Move", Washington Post, March 23, p. E-12.

External links

 Georgetown profile

1966 births
21st-century African-American people
20th-century African-American sportspeople
Living people
African-American basketball coaches
African-American basketball players
Basketball coaches from Washington, D.C.
Basketball players from Washington, D.C.
College men's basketball head coaches in the United States
Georgetown Hoyas men's basketball coaches
Gonzaga College High School alumni
Princeton Tigers men's basketball coaches
Princeton Tigers men's basketball players
American men's basketball players